Nuno Miguel Pereira Lopes (born 6 May 1978) is a Portuguese actor and DJ. He's internationally known for his role in Saint George, the Portuguese entry for the Best Foreign Language Film at the 90th Academy Awards, and most recently for his role at Netflix TV series, White Lines as Duarte "Boxer" Silva.

Career
Nuno Lopes was born in Lisbon. He graduated from the Lisbon Theatre and Film School, attended the Master Class at the École des Maîtres, and invested in studying abroad, being taught by Robert Castle, Susan Batson, Tom Brangle e Wass M. Stevens. Complementing his acting career, he has acquired additional skills during his formation: artistic fencing, dance, singing and music.

His wide experience in theatre was built with the acting of pieces by renowned playwrights, like Bertold Brecht, William Shakespeare, August Strindberg, Heiner Muller, Georges Perec, Beaumarchais, Ferenc Molnár and Pierre Corneille. Among them are Man Equals Man, Cymbeline and The Marriage of Figaro.

Filmography

Film

Television

Awards and nominations

References

External links
 Subtitle Talent

1978 births
Living people
People from Lisbon
Portuguese male actors
Golden Globes (Portugal) winners
Lisbon Theatre and Film School alumni
Portuguese DJs
21st-century Portuguese male actors